Property law is the area of law that governs the various forms of ownership in real property (land) and personal property. Property refers to legally protected claims to resources, such as land and personal property, including intellectual property. Property can be exchanged through contract law, and if property is violated, one could sue under tort law to protect it.

The concept, idea or philosophy of property underlies all property law. In some jurisdictions, historically all property was owned by the monarch and it devolved through feudal land tenure or other feudal systems of loyalty and fealty.

History 
Though the Napoleonic code was among the first government acts of modern times to introduce the notion of absolute ownership into statute, protection of personal property rights was present in medieval Islamic law and jurisprudence, and in more feudalist forms in the common law courts of medieval and early modern England.

Theory
The word property, in everyday usage, refers to an object (or objects) owned by a person—a car, a book, or a cellphone—and the relationship the person has to it. In law, the concept acquires a more nuanced rendering. Factors to consider include the nature of the object, the relationship between the person and the object, the relationship between a number of people in relation to the object, and how the object is regarded within the prevailing political system. Most broadly and concisely, property in the legal sense refers to the rights of people in or over certain objects or things.

Non-legally recognized or documented property rights are known as informal property rights.  These informal property rights are non-codified or documented, but recognized among local residents to varying degrees.

Justifications and drawbacks of property rights 
In capitalist societies with market economies, much of property is owned privately by persons or associations and not the government. Five general justifications have been given on private property rights:

 Private property is an efficient way to manage resources in a decentralized basis, allowing expertise and specialization to develop with regard to the property.
 Private property is a powerful incentive for owners to put it to productive use, because they stand to gain in the investment.
 Private property allows exchanges and modifications.
 Private property is an important source of individual autonomy, giving individuals independence and identity distinct from others.
 Private property, being dispersed, allows individuals to exercise freedom, against others or against the government.

Arguments in favor of limiting private property rights have also been raised:

 Private property can be used in a way that is harmful to others, such as a factory owner causing loud noises in nearby neighborhoods. In economics, this is known as a negative externality. Nuisance laws and government regulations (such as zoning) have been used to limit an owners' right to use the property in certain ways.
 Property can lead to monopolies, giving the owner the power to unfairly extract advantages from others. Because of this, there are laws on competition and antitrust. 
 Property can lead to the commodification of certain domains which people would prefer not to be commodified, such as social relations. There is debate in certain countries, for example, on whether organ sales or sex services should be legal.
 Private property gives individuals power, which can exacerbate over time and lead to too much inequality within a society. The propensity for inequality is justification of wealth redistribution.

Natural rights and property
In his Second Treatise on Government, English philosopher John Locke asserted the right of an individual to own one part of the world, when, according to the Bible, God gave the world to all humanity in common. He claimed that although persons belong to God, they own the fruits of their labor. When a person works, that labor enters into the object. Thus, the object becomes the property of that person. However, Locke conditioned property on the Lockean proviso, that is, "there is enough, and as good, left in common for others".

U.S. Supreme Court Justice James Wilson undertook a survey of the philosophical grounds of American property law in 1790 and 1791. He proceeds from two premises: “Every crime includes an injury: every injury includes a violation of a right.” (Lectures III, ii.) The government's role in protecting property depends upon an idea of right. Wilson believes that "man has a natural right to his property, to his character, to liberty, and to safety.” He also indicates that “the primary and principal object in the institution of government... was... to acquire a new security for the possession or the recovery of those rights”.

Wilson states that: “Property is the right or lawful power, which a person has to a thing.” He then divides the right into three degrees: possession, the lowest; possession and use; and, possession, use, and disposition – the highest. Further, he states: “Useful and skillful industry is the soul of an active life. But industry should have her just reward. That reward is property, for of useful and active industry, property is the natural result.” From this simple reasoning he is able to present the conclusion that exclusive, as opposed to communal property, is to be preferred. Wilson does, however, give a survey of communal property arrangements in history, not only in colonial Virginia but also ancient Sparta.

Property rights 
There are two main views on the right to property, the traditional view and the bundle of rights view. The traditionalists believe that there is a core, inherent meaning in the concept of property, while the bundle of rights view states that the property owner only has bundle of permissible uses over the property. The two views exist on a spectrum and the difference may be a matter of focus and emphasis.

William Blackstone, in his Commentaries on the Laws of England, wrote that the essential core of property is the right to exclude. That is, the owner of property must be able to exclude others from the thing in question, even though the right to exclude is subject to limitations. By implication, the owner can use the thing, unless another restriction, such as zoning law, prevents it. Other traditionalists argue that three main rights define property: the right to exclusion, use and transfer.

An alternative view of property, favored by legal realists, is that property simply denotes a bundle of rights defined by law and social policy. Which rights are included in the bundle known as property rights, and which bundles are preferred to which others, is simply a matter of policy. Therefore, a government can prevent the building of a factory on a piece of land, through zoning law or criminal law, without damaging the concept of property. The "bundle of rights" view was prominent in academia in the 20th century and remains influential today in American law.

Priority

Different parties may claim a competing interest in the same property by mistake or by fraud, with the claims being inconsistent of each other. For example, the party creating or transferring an interest may have a valid title, but may intentionally or negligently create several interests wholly or partially inconsistent with each other. A court resolves the dispute by adjudicating the priorities of the interests.

Property rights and rights to people
Property rights are rights over things enforceable against all other persons. By contrast, contractual rights are rights enforceable against particular persons. Property rights may, however, arise from a contract; the two systems of rights overlap. In relation to the sale of land, for example, two sets of legal relationships exist alongside one another: the contractual right to sue for damages, and the property right exercisable over the land. More minor property rights may be created by contract, as in the case of easements, covenants, and equitable servitudes.

A separate distinction is evident where the rights granted are insufficiently substantial to confer on the nonowner a definable interest or right in the thing. The clearest example of these rights is the license. In general, even if licenses are created by a binding contract, they do not give rise to property interests.

Property rights and personal rights 
Property rights are also distinguished from personal rights. Practically all contemporary societies acknowledge this basic ontological and ethical distinction. In the past, groups lacking political power have often been disqualified from the benefits of property. In an extreme form, this has meant that people have become "objects" of property—legally "things" or chattels (see slavery.) More commonly, marginalized groups have been denied legal rights to own property. These include Jews in England and married women in Western societies until the late 19th century.

The dividing line between personal rights and property rights is not always easy to draw. For instance, is one's reputation property that can be commercially exploited by affording property rights to it? The question of the proprietary character of personal rights is particularly relevant in the case of rights over human tissue, organs and other body parts.

The rights of women to control their own body have been in some times and some places subordinated to other people's control over their fetus. For example, government intervention that controls the conditions of birthing by prohibiting or requiring caesarian sections. Whether and how a woman becomes pregnant or carries a pregnancy to term is also subject to laws mandating or forbidding abortion, or restricting access to birth control. A woman's right to control her body during pregnancy or possible pregnancy – what work she does, what food or substances she ingests, other activities she engages in – have also frequently been subject to restrictions by many other parties; in response, a number of countries have passed laws banning pregnancy discrimination.  English judges have recently made the point that such women lack the right to exclusive control over their own bodies, formerly considered a fundamental common-law right.

In the United States, a "quasi-property" interest has been explicitly declared in the dead body. Also in the United States, it has been recognised that people have an alienable proprietary "right of publicity" over their "persona". The patent/patenting of biotechnological processes and products based on human genetic material may be characterised as creating property in human life.

A particularly difficult question is whether people have rights to intellectual property developed by others from their body parts. In the pioneering case on this issue, the Supreme Court of California held in Moore v. Regents of the University of California (1990) that individuals do not have such a property right.

Classification 
Property law is characterised by a great deal of historical continuity and technical terminology. The basic distinction in common law systems is between real property (land) and personal property (chattels).

Before the mid-19th century, the principles governing the transfer of real property and personal property on an intestacy were quite different. Though this dichotomy does not have the same significance anymore, the distinction is still fundamental because of the essential differences between the two categories. An obvious example is the fact that land is immovable, and thus the rules that govern its use must differ. A further reason for the distinction is that legislation is often drafted employing the traditional terminology.

The division of land and chattels has been criticised as being not satisfactory as a basis for categorising the principles of property law since it concentrates attention not on the proprietary interests themselves but on the objects of those interests. Moreover, in the case of fixtures, chattels which are affixed to or placed on land may become part of the land.

Real property is generally sub-classified into:
 corporeal hereditaments – tangible real property (land)
 incorporeal hereditaments – intangible real property such as an easement of way

Although a tenancy involves rights to real property, a leasehold estate is typically considered personal property, being derived from contract law. In the civil law system, the distinction is between movable and immovable property, with movable property roughly corresponding to personal property, while immovable property corresponding to real estate or real property, and the associated rights, and obligations thereon.

Possession 
The concept of possession developed from a legal system whose principal concern was to avoid civil disorder. The general principle is that a person in possession of land or goods, even as a wrongdoer, is entitled to take action against anyone interfering with the possession unless the person interfering is able to demonstrate a superior right to do so.

In England, the Torts (Interference with Goods) Act 1977 has significantly amended the law relating to wrongful interference with goods and abolished some longstanding remedies and doctrines.

Transfer of property 
The term "transfer of property" means an act by which a living person, company, or state conveys property, in present or in future, to one or more other living persons, to himself and one or more other living persons, to the state, or to a private company. The transfer of property can be consensual or non-consensual, and to transfer property is to perform such an act.

Consensual transfers 
The most common method of acquiring an interest in property is as the result of a consensual transaction with the previous owner, for example, a sale, a gift, or through inheritance. In law, an inheritor is a person who is entitled to receive a share of the heritor's (the person who died) property, subject to the rules of inheritance in the jurisdiction of which the heritor was a citizen or where the heritor died or owned property at the time of death. Dispositions by will may also be regarded as consensual transactions, since the effect of a will is to provide for the distribution of the deceased person's property to nominated beneficiaries. A person may also obtain an interest in property under a trust established for his or her benefit by the owner of the property.

Non-consensual transfers 
It is also possible for property to pass from one person to another independently of the consent of the property owner. For example, this occurs when a person dies intestate, goes bankrupt, or has the property taken in execution of a court judgment.

There are cases when a person is legally capable of owning property, but is not capable of maintaining and dealing with it (such as paying property taxes). This is the case for young children and mentally handicapped individuals. The state deems them incompetent in their capacity to deal with property. Thus, they must be appointed a legal guardian to deal with the property on the incompetent individual's behalf. In cases where the individual cannot find a legal guardian to deal with the property, the property is put up for sale and the incompetent individual is involuntarily deprived of such property.

Tax sales are another process by which individuals can be forcibly deprived of their private property. A tax sale is the forced sale of property by the state due to unpaid taxes on that property. The property is typically auctioned off as a tax sale by the local government to payoff the delinquent taxes on that property. One could make the argument that, given the presence of property taxes, an individual never truly owns a piece of property; they rent it from the government.

Property can also pass from one person to the state independently of the consent of the property owner through the state's power of eminent domain. Eminent domain refers to the ability of the state to buyout private property from individuals at their will in order to use the property for public use. Eminent domain requires the state to "justly compensate" the property owner for the acquisition of their land. The practice dates back to at least the 17th century. Common examples include buying land from individuals in order for the state to build public roads, transportation systems, governmental buildings, and to construct certain public goods. The state also uses its eminent domain power for large urban renewal projects by which it will buy out large portions of typically poor housing areas in order to rebuild it.

Eminent domain also consists of enabling the state to condemn certain real estate construction and development rights for various reasons. One must meet location specific regulatory standards and building codes in order to construct on property. The general rule for stairs (in the US) is 7-11 (a 7-inch rise and 11 inch run). More exactly, no more than 7 3/4 inches for the riser (vertical) and a minimum of 10 inches for the tread (horizontal or step). Failure to meet these regulatory standards can result in an inability to receive state building permits, state destruction of property, legal fines, and increased liability.

KELO V. NEW LONDON (04-108) 545 U.S. 469 (2005) was a pivotal case that increased the scope of the eminent domain power of the state. The U.S. supreme court ruled that private property could be condemned by the state and transferred to a private company.

Legal successor 
In property law, economics and finance, the term "legal successor" may refer to a legally established successor of property rights (inheritance, interest) or in terms of liabilities (debt).

In the case of bankruptcy of a lender, the legal successor in interest has the right to collect the debt.

Lease 
Historically, leases served many purposes, and the regulation varied according to intended purposes and the economic conditions of the time. Leaseholds, for example, were mainly granted for agriculture until the late eighteenth century and early nineteenth century, when the growth of cities made the leasehold an important form of landholding in urban areas.

The modern law of landlord and tenant in common law jurisdictions retains the influence of the common law and, particularly, the laissez-faire philosophy that dominated the law of contract and the law of property in the 19th century. With the growth of consumerism, the law of consumer protection recognised that common law principles assuming equal bargaining power between parties may cause unfairness. Consequently, reformers have emphasised the need to assess residential tenancy laws in terms of protection they provide to tenants. Legislation to protect tenants is now common.

Ownership

Single individuals 
Property can mostly be owned by any single human. However, many jurisdictions have some stipulations that limit property-owning capacity. The two main limiting factors include citizenship and competency of maintaining property.

In many countries, non-citizens cannot own property or are limited greatly in their capacity to own property. The United States allows foreign entities to buy and own property. But the United States does have stipulations surrounding tribal land owned by the indigenous Native Americans.

Incompetent individuals also cannot own property, at least without a legal guardian. Incompetent individuals consist largely of children and the cognitively impaired. They are legally recognized and allowed to own property, but they cannot deal with it without the consent of their legal guardians. Children do not have the capacity to pay property taxes.

Groups 
All western legal systems allow for a number of different forms of group ownership of property. Group ownership in property law is referred to as co-tenancy, or concurrent ownership. Two or more owners of a property are referred to as co-owners.

Concurrent owners 
In U.S. common law, property can be owned by many different people and parties. Property can be shared by an infinitely divisible number of people. There are three types of concurrent estates, or ways people can jointly own property: joint tenancy, tenancy in common, or tenancy by entirety.

Joint Tenancy 
In joint tenancy, each owner of the property has an undivided interest in it along with full and complete ownership. Each owner in joint tenancy has the full right to occupy and use all of it. If one owner dies in joint tenancy, then the other owner takes control of the deceased owner's interest.

Tenancy in Common 
In tenancy in common, the shares of ownership can be equal or unequal is size. One person may own a larger share of the property than another. Even if owners own an unequal amount of shares, all owners still have the right to use all of the property. If one owner dies, their share of the property is transferred to the designated individual in their will contract.

Tenancy by the Entirety 
In tenancy by the entirety, each owner of the property has an undivided interest in it along with full and complete ownership. Each spouse has the full right to occupy and use all of the property. It is only available to married couples. A spouse cannot transfer their interest in the property without the consent of the other spouse. If the couple divorces and goes to court, a judge is granted wide discretion on how to divide the share interests of the property in common-law jurisdictions.

Corporate owners 
Corporations are legal non-human entities that are entitled to property rights just as an individual human is. A corporation has legal power to use and possess property just as a fictitious legal human would. However, a corporation isn't a single human, it is the collective will of a group of people who provide a service or build a good. With many agent in play, there are many different and opposing interests in play with respect to ownership. The majority of property is now owned by corporations. They were created under general incorporation statutes that allow such fictitious legal persons to have property rights.

State owners 
The community, or the state, can have many different roles concerning property: facilitator, protector, and owner. In capitalist market economies, the state largely serves as a mediator that facilitates and enforces private property laws.

Communist ideals oppose private property laws. Communism / Marxism advocates for full state / public ownership of property. "Private property has made us so stupid and one-sided that an object is only ours when we have it – when it exists for us as capital, or when it is directly possessed, eaten, drunk, worn, inhabited, etc., – in short, when it is used by us" (Marx).  However, it is important to note that many Marxist-Leninist societies such as China and the dissolved Soviet Union have forms of private property laws. 

In the United States, "the federal government owns roughly 640 million acres, about 28% of the 2.27 billion acres of land in the United States. Four major federal land management agencies administer 606.5 million acres of this land (as of September 30, 2018). They are the Bureau of Land Management (BLM), Fish and Wildlife Service (FWS), and National Park Service (NPS) in the Department of the Interior (DOI) and the Forest Service (FS) in the Department of Agriculture. A fifth agency, the Department of Defense (excluding the U.S. Army Corps of Engineers), administers 8.8 million acres in the United States (as of September 30, 2017), consisting of military bases, training ranges, and more. Together, the five agencies manage about 615.3 million acres, or 27% of the U.S. land base. Many other agencies administer the remaining federal acreage."

See also
 Claim club
 Conversion (law)
 Detinue
 Escheat
 Rei vindicatio
 Replevin
 Torrens title
 Trover
 Infectious invalidity

Property law in different jurisdictions 

 Ghanaian property law
United States property law
English property law
 Scots property law
South African property law
Australian property law

Notes

References

 AA Berle, 'Property, Production and Revolution' (1965) 65 Columbia Law Review 1
 AA Berle, 'Family Lawsuits Over Real Property' (2012) Los Angeles Article Review on Real Property 2 
 

 
Common law legal systems
Common law